The Maguga Dam is a dam on the Komati River in Eswatini. It was built as a joint project of the governments of South Africa and Eswatini. As of 2005, it was the largest public works project ever undertaken by Eswatini. The dam was completed in mid-2001. 

In 1992, the two countries signed a treaty covering the "design, construction, operation and maintenance" of the Driekoppies and Maguga Dams. As the former benefited South Africa exclusively (though the resulting reservoir lay partially in Eswatini), South Africa bore the entire cost for that dam. As for the latter, Eswatini was responsible for about 40% of the cost. The dam's primary purpose is irrigation (for water-intensive sugar cane, forestry and "about 1000 of Eswatini's small farmers") but a hydroelectric power station with a capacity of 20 MW (generated from two units, each with a capacity of 9.9 MW) was to be completed in October 2006.

Maguga is a "clay-core rockfill embankment dam". There is a -long labyrinth spillway.

Droughts have caused major problems. In 2007, the dam's capacity was down to 37%. In 2015, the water levels at the dam were at a record low, and on 20 February 2016, the water storage level was measured at 31%.

The project displaced about 1000 people.

The Maguga Dam Joint Venture received a commendation from the South African Association of Consulting Engineers in the category of Engineering Excellence with a value greater than R5 million for 2002. The dam also won the Concrete Society of Southern Africa's 2003 Fulton Award for Civil Engineering Structures.

References

External links
 Maguga Dam photo gallery

Dams in Eswatini
Dams completed in 2001